Car-Jacked is novel by British author Ali Sparkes. The story follows a 12-year-old child genius Jack Mattingly and his friendship with the hijacker of his parents' Toyota Prius. The book was shortlisted for a 2017 Red House Children's Book Award in the "Book For Older Readers" category, which was won by One.

Plot
Twelve-year-old Jack Mattingly and his parents, Nigel and Leonie, are at a petrol station in Northumberland. Jack is left alone in the car while his parents go into the station, when the car is hi-jacked by the bank robber Ross, who believes it to be empty.

Upon discovering Jack, Ross throws him out, but returns to rescue him when he realises that the boy has asthma and needs his inhaler. As Jack goes to sleep, Ross receives a call from his crime boss James Shearer, who gives him an ultimatum to get hold of £100,000. Jack has overheard the conversation and starts to describe to Ross how the police will find him and arrest him.

Meanwhile, Jack's parents are discussing the disappearance with the police, and Leonie is wondering whether a ransom will be necessary. The police find out Ross' identity.

The car crashes into a ravine, with both Jack and Ross surviving. James Shearer sends a video message with a suffocating man to Ross' phone. Ross explains that the man is his younger brother, Stuart, who has stolen money from James Shearer. To save his brother, Ross needs to give £100,000 to Shearer for the return of his brother. It soon occurs to Ross that Jack can help him save Stuart.

A regional broadcast is made about how Jack is missing and Leonie goes hysterical about he didn't have his Omega 3 pills with him.

When Jack and Ross go over some peat bogs, Jack explains the damage they are doing to their environment and his life story with it. They find a house which they break into. Jack indulges himself in sugar, Weetabix and Tetley tea bags. Jack explains that his mum is very competitive and Ross compares her with his horrible mum, who swapped him for a paper ticket. Ross goes over how his mother abandoned him and was placed into care, where his brother got placed in care a few years later.

They go out to the side of the road to flag a truck down. They soon flag down a Polish man named Yanos, who agrees to give them a ride. A report comes in for a missing boy, and Jack hears his mum's hysterics.

Characters
 -A twelve-year-old genius recognised by Mensa International. His intelligence is in the top 1% of the population. His intelligence often helps him out in various situations, but he has no friends apart from Faresh, whose friendship was ruined by his mother Leonie Mattingly. 
 -A twenty-seven-year-old Glaswegian bank robber. He had served in prison for 6 years after a robbery and was on parole. When Stuart McAllister, his brother, manipulated him into thinking he was going to die if Ross didn't give Shearer £100,000, he robbed the National Scottish Bank in Dundee, getting only £95,300. He had a job at a packaging manufacturers in Perth. He had been going to night classes in Art, Psychology and English at a college. There is more to him than grand theft auto and robbery.
 -An English woman in her late thirties. She is very strict and sincere and very, very OTT and protective in the welfare of her son. She keeps her son's life in a rigid schedule until her Toyota Prius is hijacked. She wants her son to succeed and go into Oxbridge.
 -An Englishman who is very relaxed about his son's achievements and regards him to be special, but not in the same OTT manner that his wife has. It is clear he is proud of his son throughout the book for coping in an unfamiliar situation.
 -A policeman who is determined to find Jack Mattingly before harm can be done to him. He is very clever and has persuasive skills. He knows when a thing is right or wrong and what is good or bad.
 -A policewoman who is on the same level as DI Taunton.

References 

2015 British novels
Oxford University Press books
21st-century British novels
British children's novels
British children's books